TCL1 upstream neural differentiation-associated RNA is a long noncoding RNA that in humans is produced from the TUNAR gene.

References

Further reading 

 

Genes
Human proteins